Jürgen Reulecke (born 12 February 1940) is a German historian and emeritus professor.

Life 
Born in Düsseldorf, in his childhood Reulecke was a member of a catholic boys' group. He studied history, German Studies and philosophy at the universities of Münster, Bonn and Bochum. In 1972 he received his doctorate under Wolfgang Köllmann and in 1979 his habilitation. From 1984 to 2003 he was professor of modern and contemporary history at the University of Siegen. Since 2003 he has taught at the University of Giessen and was spokesperson of the special research area "Memory Cultures". He is a member of the PEN Centre Germany.

Research 
Reulecke's research focuses on social history, especially the illumination of the youth movement. He has also distinguished himself as an urbanization historian.

Publications 
 Eine junge Generation im Schützengraben: "Der Wanderer zwischen beiden Welten" by Walter Flex.  In Dirk van Laak: Literatur, die Geschichte schrieb. Vandenhoeck & Ruprecht, Göttingen 2011, 
 Bergische Miniaturen.: Geschichten und Erfahrungen , Essen 2010
 100 Jahre Jugendherbergen 1909–2009. (together with Barbara Stambolis). Klartext, Essen 2009.
 Kriegskinder in Ostdeutschland und Polen, vbb, Verlag für Berlin-Brandenburg, 2008
 Wissenschaften im 20. Jahrhundert. Steiner, Stuttgart 2008
 Söhne ohne Väter. Chr. Links, Berlin 2004
 (ed.): Generationalität und Lebensgeschichte im 20. Jahrhundert (Schriften des Historischen Kollegs. Kolloquien 58). Munich 2003,  (Numerised).
 Das Ruhrgebiet und die „Volksgesundheit“., Essen 2001
 Rückkehr in die Ferne. Juventa, Weinheim 1997
 Spagat mit Kopftuch. Ed. Körber-Stiftung, Hamburg 1997
 Geschichte der Urbanisierung in Deutschland, Suhrkamp, Frankfurt am Main 1992
 as editor with Diethart Kerbs: Handbuch der deutschen Reformbewegungen 1880–1933. Wuppertal 1998.

References

External links 

 
 Persönliche Seite im Internetauftritt der Universität Gießen

20th-century German historians
Academic staff of the University of Siegen
Academic staff of the University of Giessen
1940 births
Living people
Writers from Düsseldorf